The Prix André Baboin is a Listed flat horse race in France open to thoroughbreds aged three years or older. It is run at various racecourses over distances of around 2,000 metres (1¼ miles), and it is scheduled to take place each year in October.

History
The event was established in 1982, and it was originally called the Grand Prix des Provinces. Instead of having a permanent venue, it was designed to alternate between the main regional racecourses of France. The first three editions were held at Bordeaux le Bouscat, Lyon-Parilly and Marseille-Borély.

The early runnings of the Grand Prix des Provinces were contested over 2,000 metres. The event was given Group 3 status in 1984.

The race was renamed in memory of André Baboin in 1986. Baboin served as the chairman of the Société des Courses de Lyon, and was also a committee member of the Société d'Encouragement. He died in 1985.

The Prix André Baboin was extended to 2,200 metres in 1987. It was restored to 2,000 metres in 1993. Its original sequence of venues — Bordeaux, Lyon and Marseille — was repeated until 2000. It was staged at Toulouse in 2001.

The event was switched between Lyon and Bordeaux between 2002 and 2011, and returned to Marseille-Borély in 2012.  The 2013 running took place at Bordeaux again, followed by Lyon in 2014. Its distance at Bordeaux is now 1,900 metres. In 2015 the race was run at Angers and it returned to Lyon in 2016, then Bordeaux in 2017 and Marseilles in 2018. It was downgraded to Listed status in 2018.

Records
Most successful horse:
 no horse has won this race more than once

Leading jockey (3 wins):
 Gérald Mossé – Partipral (1994), Astarabad (1997), Right Wing (2000)
 Olivier Peslier – Parme (1995), Homeland (2001), Doctor Dino (2006)

Leading trainer (3 wins):
 Alain de Royer-Dupré – Lowell (1989), Astarabad (1997), Valentino (2004)
 Élie Lellouche – Our Account (1990), Parme (1995), Starlish (2009)
 François Rohaut – Homeland (2001), Sign of the Wolf (2003), Bal de la Rose (2007)
 Jean-Claude Rouget – Flanaghan Cocktail  (1991), Kadance Ville (1999), Zafiro (2017)

Leading owner (2 wins):
 Gary Tanaka – Homeland (2001), Caesarion (2002)

Winners

Distance and venue

 1982: 2,000m, Bordeaux le Bouscat
 1983: 2,000m, Lyon-Parilly
 1984: 2,000m, Marseille-Borély
 1985: 2,000m, Bordeaux le Bouscat
 1986: 2,200m, Lyon-Parilly
 1987: 2,200m, Marseille-Borély
 1988: 2,200m, Bordeaux le Bouscat
 1989: 2,200m, Lyon-Parilly
 1990: 2,200m, Marseille-Borély
 1991: 2,200m, Bordeaux le Bouscat
 1992: 2,200m, Lyon-Parilly
 1993: 2,000m, Marseille-Borély
 1994: 1,900m, Bordeaux le Bouscat
 1995: 2,000m, Lyon-Parilly
 1996: 2,000m, Marseille-Borély
 1997: 1,900m, Bordeaux le Bouscat
 1998: 2,000m, Lyon-Parilly
 1999: 2,000m, Marseille-Borély
 2000: 1,900m, Bordeaux le Bouscat
 2001: 2,000m, Toulouse
 2002: 2,000m, Lyon-Parilly
 2003: 2,000m, Lyon-Parilly
 2004: 1,900m, Bordeaux le Bouscat
 2005: 2,000m, Lyon-Parilly
 2006: 1,900m, Bordeaux le Bouscat
 2007: 2,000m, Lyon-Parilly
 2008: 1,900m, Bordeaux le Bouscat
 2009: 2,000m, Lyon-Parilly
 2010: 1,900m, Bordeaux le Bouscat
 2011: 2,000m, Lyon-Parilly
 2012: 2,000m, Marseille-Borély
 2013: 1,900m, Bordeaux le Bouscat
 2014: 2,000m, Lyon-Parilly
 2015: 2,000m, Angers
 2016: 2,000m, Lyon-Parilly
 2017: 1,900m, Bordeaux le Bouscat
 2018: 2,000m, Marseille-Borély

See also
 List of French flat horse races
 Recurring sporting events established in 1982 – this race is included under its original title, Grand Prix des Provinces.

References

 France Galop / Racing Post:
 france-galop.com – A Brief History: Prix André Baboin.
 galopp-sieger.de – Prix André Baboin (ex Grand Prix des Provinces).
 horseracingintfed.com – International Federation of Horseracing Authorities – Prix André Baboin (2017).
 pedigreequery.com – Prix André Baboin.

Open middle distance horse races
Horse races in France
Recurring sporting events established in 1982
1982 establishments in France